Jan Kjærulff (30 December 1943 – 25 August 2006) was a sailor from Denmark. He was born in Maglegård. Kjærulff represented his country at the 1972 Summer Olympics in Kiel. Kjærulff took 13th place in the Soling with Paul Elvstrøm as helmsman and Valdemar Bandolowski as fellow crew member. Kjærulff died in August 2006. With Paul Elvstrøm he formed Elvstrøm & Kjærulff Yacht Design, and Kjærulff is credited with the design of many yachts.

See also
Elvstrøm 717

References

External links
 
 
 

1943 births
2006 deaths
Danish male sailors (sport)
Danish yacht designers
Olympic sailors of Denmark
Sailors at the 1972 Summer Olympics – Soling
People from Gentofte Municipality
Sportspeople from the Capital Region of Denmark